Adat Perpatih (also known as Lareh Bodi Caniago) are customary laws which originated from the Minangkabau Highlands in Sumatra, Indonesia. It was founded by a Minangkabau leader named Sutan Balun or more famously known as Dato Perpatih Nan Sebatang. In Malaysia, Adat Perpatih is a combination of practices and rules of life for the Minangkabau people and other aborigins such as Semang, Temuan people, the Bersisi and the Jakun people that were mainly farmers at that time. Over time, this custom is practiced by many other ethnics especially in Negeri Sembilan, including part of Malacca in particular of Masjid Tanah, and part of Johor.

Custom

The system practices democracy in electing chiefs and a king. Only men are eligible to be elected as leaders for their clan or tribe. There is also a female leader known as Ibu Soko. Their culture is matrilineal and patriarchal, with property and land passing down from mother to daughter, while religious and political affairs are the responsibility of men. This is to protect  the honor and dignity of Adat Perpatih women. That means, however poor an Adat Perpatih woman may be,  she will never have to sell her dignity to earn a living. If she is divorced and returns to her village, she has lands to work on to earn a living. While the son is considered more robust, can live under any conditions and have lesser need for a house. The ancestral land is guarded by male clan leaders, chiefdom's and chieftain. An Adat Perpatih woman may not sell the land or pass the land to her sons. If she does not have any daughters, she may pass the land to her son's daughters by adopting them and thus passing her clan and tribe name to them through a ceremony called berkedim. Property or land that a man earns  is not included under this custom. He can however add to this ancestral inheritance out of his own free will. This custom follows the Islamic obligation that Muslim men have to provide shelter and basic welfare of their divorced female relatives and their children.

This custom is protected by their king. The monarchy is an elective monarchy unlike most other monarchies worldwide. Unlike the society, the royal families  are patrilineal. However, like the society, the monarchy is also patriarchal.

There is no exact date recorded when this custom created. But the custom was brought to the Malay Peninsula (Peninsular Malaysia) by Minangkabau nomads in 14th century.  This custom might have existed since 3000–4000 years ago based on its similarity with the Oceanian people especially the Polynesian people who like the Minangkabau also speak Malayo-Polynesian languages. This custom is also practised by the Comorian when the Malayo-Polynesian migrated to Africa 2000 years ago. Adat perpatih is similar to Oceanian matrilineal inheritance in the sense that both systems practise inalienable possessions. However the monarchy system is different. The Palauan king and queen are brother and sister and each has their own spouses.

See also
 Minangkabau culture
 Culture of Indonesia
 Adat

References

Minangkabau
Malay culture
Women in Indonesia